Hayley Tullett (née Parry, born 17 February 1973) is a Welsh former middle distance runner who mainly competed over 1500 metres. She won a bronze medal in the 1500m final at the 2003 World Championships. She also competed for Great Britain in two Olympic Games (2000 and 2004).

Born Hayley Parry in Swansea in 1973, she married pole vaulter Ian Tullett in 1999.

Personal bests
800 metres – 2:00.49 (2003)
1500 metres – 3:59.95 (2004)
3000 metres – 8:45.39 (2000)

Achievements

References

External links



1973 births
Living people
People from Morriston
Sportspeople from Swansea
Welsh female middle-distance runners
Athletes (track and field) at the 2000 Summer Olympics
Athletes (track and field) at the 2004 Summer Olympics
Athletes (track and field) at the 2006 Commonwealth Games
Commonwealth Games silver medallists for Wales
Commonwealth Games bronze medallists for Wales
Olympic athletes of Great Britain
World Athletics Championships medalists
World Athletics Championships athletes for Great Britain
Commonwealth Games medallists in athletics
Medallists at the 2006 Commonwealth Games